Duke Hui I of Qin (died 492 BC) was, from 500 to 492 BC, the 20th ruler of the Zhou Dynasty Chinese state of Qin that eventually united China to become the Qin Dynasty.  His ancestral name was Ying (嬴), and Duke Hui was his posthumous title. He was the first of the two rulers of Qin called Duke Hui.

In 501 BC Duke Ai of Qin, Duke Hui's grandfather, died after a reign of 36 years. Duke Hui's father predeceased Duke Ai and was given the posthumous title Duke Yi (秦夷公).  Therefore, Duke Hui succeeded his grandfather as the ruler of Qin.

Duke Hui reigned for nine years and died in 492 BC. He was succeeded by his son Duke Dao of Qin.

References

Year of birth unknown
Rulers of Qin
5th-century BC Chinese monarchs
492 BC deaths